Kenneth John Richardson (19 April 1918 – 1998) was an English athlete who competed in the 1938 British Empire Games.

Life
Kenneth John Richardson was born in Bedfordshire on 19 April 1918.  He was educated at Bedford Modern School.

At the 1938 Empire Games he was also a member of the English relay team which won the silver medal in the 4×110 yards event. In the 100 yards competition as well as in the 220 yards contest he was eliminated in the heats.

References

External links
commonwealthgames.com results
Rootsweb entry

1918 births
1998 deaths
English male sprinters
Athletes (track and field) at the 1938 British Empire Games
Commonwealth Games silver medallists for England
People educated at Bedford Modern School
Commonwealth Games medallists in athletics
20th-century English people
Medallists at the 1938 British Empire Games